Lois Maffeo (professionally known for much of her career as Lois) is an American musician and writer who lives in Olympia, Washington. She has been closely involved with and influenced many independent musicians, especially in the 1990s-era Olympia, Seattle and Washington, D.C. music scenes.

Early life
Maffeo was raised in Phoenix, Arizona, and graduated in 1981 from Xavier College Preparatory, an all-female private Catholic high school. She moved to Olympia, Washington to attend The Evergreen State College.

Discography

As Lois Maffeo

albums
The Union Themes (with Brendan Canty of Fugazi), 2000, Kill Rock Stars (Japanese release contains five bonus tracks)

compilations and other collaborations/appearances
[Untitled a cappella track], Dangerous Business International cassette, 1985, K Records
"My Head Hurts" (with The Go Team), Archer Come Sparrow cassette, 1988/1989, K Records
"Cup to the Wall" (with Satisfact), Life Abroad 7-inch single, 1996, K Records
"Thick with the Paint Swaying" (with Red Stars Theory), But Sleep Came Slowly, 1997, Rx. Remedy
"Cat Fight" (with Georgia Hubley), 2 Days in the Valley OST, 1997, Edel
"Switch Shower Go!", Go! Olympia cassette, 1997, Yoyo Recordings
"A Sailor's Warning" (with Red Stars Theory), Life in a Bubble Can Be Beautiful, 1999, Touch & Go Records
"Pathways" (with The Evil Tambourines), Library Nation, 1999, Sub Pop
"On Mars And Venus" (with The Evil Tambourines), Library Nation, 1999, Sub Pop
"Shame The Bells", Projector: Another Studio Compilation, 1999, Yoyo Recordings
"Hope" (with Internal/External), Featuring..., 2000, K Records
"The Same As Being in Love" (with Harvey Danger), King James Version, 2000, Sire
"Spray on the Fixative" (with Mark Robinson), Origami And Urbanism, 2003, Tomlab

With Cradle Robbers (with Rebecca Gates of the Spinanes)

compilations
"Sotto Voce", Red Hot + Bothered/Indie Rock Guide To Dating, 1995, Kinetic/Reprise

With Lumihoops

compilations
"Roman Holiday", Throw: The Yoyo Studio Compilation, 1992, Yoyo Recordings

With Courtney Love (the band)

singles and EPs
Uncrushworthy 7-inch EP, 1990, K Records
Highlights 7-inch EP, 1991, K Records
Hey! Antoinette 7-inch EP, 1991, Feel Good All Over

compilations
"Don't Mix The Colors", Kill Rock Stars, 1991, Kill Rock Stars
"Spray", Throw: The Yoyo Studio Compilation, 1992, Yoyo Recordings
"Baseball Bat", One Last Kiss, 1992, spinART Records
"Shaniko", TeenBeat Fifty, 1993, TeenBeat Records
"Motorcycle Boy", International Pop Underground Convention, 1995, K Records

As Lois

albums
Butterfly Kiss, 1992, K Records
Strumpet, 1993, K Records
Bet the Sky, 1995, K Records
Infinity Plus, 1996, K Records

Cassettes
Lowrider cassette, 1994, Slabco

 Compilations
Butter Yellow: A Lois Collection, 1996, Rebel Beat Factory

Singles and EPs
Press Play And Record 7-inch single, 1992, K Records
Trouble With Me 7-inch single, 1993, K Records
Shy Town EP, 1995, K Records
Snapshot Radio EP, 1996, K Records
Ship To Shore maxi-single/EP (with Dub Narcotic Sound System), 1996, K Records
...And His Baby Blue EP (with Sean Na Na), 1998, Polyvinyl Records

Appearances, Split singles/EPs, and other collaborations

"Indie", July [Split] 7-inch single (with Nothing Painted Blue), 1993, Simple Machines
"Long Time Gone", International Hip Swing, 1993, K Records
"Indie", Working Holiday!, 1994, Simple Machines
"Strumpet", Yoyo A Go Go, 1994, Yoyo Recordings
"St. What's-Her-Name", Free To Fight 2-CD/LP set, 1995, Chainsaw Records/Candy Ass Records (as "The Lois")
"Ship To Shore" (with Dub Narcotic Sound System), Boot Party, 1996, K Records
"A Summer Long", Paper [Split] 7-inch EP (with Mad Planets, Low, and The Receptionists), 1997, Papercut
"Girls! Girls! Girls!", Southern/Tree/Polyvinyl Fall/Winter 1998 Compilation (with Sean Na Na), 1998
"Davey", Yoyo A Go Go: Another Live Yoyo Compilation, 1999, Yoyo Recordings
"Detour" (with Bis), Social Dancing, 1999, Capitol
"Detour" (with Bis), Detour EP, 1999, Willija
"2-9476" (with Sean Na Na), Troubleman Mix-Tape, 2001, Troubleman Unlimited

With Tommy

compilations
"Go Sonics", Selector Dub Narcotic, 1998, K Records

With The Tentacles

singles and EPs
The Touch 7-inch single, 1999, K Records

With Owl & The Pussycat

albums
Owl & The Pussycat, 2003, Kill Rock Stars

References

External links

Review of 1993 Knitting Factory show by The New York Times
Profile from Trouser Press
Owl & the Pussycat Review from PopMatters
Punkrockacademy interview

Year of birth missing (living people)
Living people
American women singer-songwriters
American music critics
American indie rock musicians
K Records artists
Riot grrrl musicians
Musicians from Olympia, Washington
Musicians from Phoenix, Arizona
American women journalists
American women music critics
Women writers about music
Singer-songwriters from Washington (state)
20th-century American singers
21st-century American singers
20th-century American women singers
Dub Narcotic Sound System members
21st-century American women singers
Kill Rock Stars artists
Sub Pop artists
Singer-songwriters from Arizona
Singer-songwriters from Washington, D.C.
Women punk rock singers